Roti jala, roti kirai or roti renjis (English: net bread or lace pancake; Jawi: روتي جالا) is a popular Malay and Minangkabau tea time snack served with curry dishes which can be found in Indonesia, Malaysia and Singapore. This is a very traditional Malay dish that is usually homemade and served at events such as weddings and festivals. It is usually eaten in sets of three to four pieces with curries, especially chicken curry, as a substitute to rice.

History

Not much is known about the history of roti jala, but it is believed that it first came from India. The recipe was tweaked by locals after arriving in Malaysia. This is why we see similarities between roti jala and ‘putu mayam’ or string hoppers.

The Malays, being originally fishermen and living by the sea, found inspiration for the snack from the nets they used for fishing, thus the name. It is also called roti renjis, which means "Rinsed Bread", because of the original way it was made, which was by hand, in which the ingredient would be 'rinsed' onto the pan to be cooked. roti kirai is another name in which 'kirai' refers to the circular motion of the hand when pouring the ingredient from a condensed milk can with tiny holes poked through it.

Jalara dosa originated from roti jala.

Preparation 
The ingredients consist mainly of flour, eggs, milk (dairy or coconut), and a pinch of turmeric. They are combined with water to form a runny batter, then drizzled onto a hot pan in a circular motion. A specialized utensil is often used, resembling a cup with multiple outlets beneath, which aids the creation of the "net-like" effect.

Comparison with string hoppers 
While both foods consist of string-like batter, roti jala is made with wheat flour while string hoppers are made with rice flour. Roti jala is made flat in a single layer (then folded or rolled up after cooking, as desired), while string hoppers are made into a small pile. Roti jala is essentially pan-fried, while string hoppers are steamed.

See also

 Roti
 Kue laba-laba - similar Indonesian dishes but sweeter
 Pek nga
 Malay cuisine

References

External links
 

Malay cuisine
Padang cuisine
Singaporean cuisine
Indonesian breads
Indonesian snack foods
Malaysian breads
Malaysian snack foods